Luc Cartillier (born 6 August 1964) is an Australian fencer. He competed in the team épée event at the 2000 Summer Olympics.

References

External links
 

1964 births
Living people
Australian male fencers
Olympic fencers of Australia
Fencers at the 2000 Summer Olympics
People from Algiers